Trevor Daniel Neill (born September 28, 1994), is an American singer and songwriter. He rose to prominence with his 2018 single "Falling", which hit the charts in more than twenty countries after going viral in 2019. His debut studio album Nicotine was released in March 2020.

Career 
Daniel started his career uploading his music to SoundCloud. His 2017 single "Pretend" eventually took off after being upload by a popular YouTube channel. He later got a call from Internet Money's Taz Taylor and signed a joint record contract with them along Alamo and Interscope in July 2018. 

Daniel released  the EPs Homesick in 2018 and Restless in 2019. The former featured the single "Falling", coming out in October that year. Despite the release of a Blackbear remix of the track it didn't become popular until 2019, after going viral on video-sharing app TikTok. It became his first charting single on the US Billboard Hot 100, peaking at number 17. The song was featured on Daniel's debut album Nicotine, also preceded by the single "Past Life" which was later re-released featuring vocals of American singer and actress Selena Gomez. 

In 2020 he was featured on "Clown" on Blackbear's album Everything Means Nothing, provided vocals for a remix of "Bitter" by Fletcher and Kito and was also featured on Don Diablo and Imanbek's single "Kill Me Better". In 2021 he collaborated with Becky G and Tainy on "F is For Friends" for The SpongeBob Movie: Sponge on the Run soundtrack and appeared on "My Dear Love" by Bebe Rexha featuring Ty Dolla $ign from the former's second album Better Mistakes. He is currently working on his second album called "Sad Now Doesn't Mean Sad Forever". In June 2021 he released "Fingers Crossed" with American singer-songwriter Julia Michaels. It was accompanied by a music video directed by Grant Spanier. He was then seen on a Music Video with a popular DJ and Record Producer Alan Walker on Alan's song 'Extremes' which released on September 30 for Alan's Upcoming studio Album 'WALKERVERSE PT. II'.

Personal life 
Daniel lived in Baton Rouge, Louisiana. His family moved to Fort Worth, Texas and later settled down in Houston, Texas where the singer calls home. Daniel admits that music became important to him in his life as a child and started playing drums in second grade. In high school, he began making music in Mixcraft 5 and recording vocals in his bedroom closet with the advice of YouTube tutorials. He decided to pursue music professionally in 2017.

Musical influences 
Daniel has been quoted revealing that his earliest influences were rap, rock, house and pop. He has cited Kanye West, Drake and Kid Cudi as influences.

Discography

Studio albums

EPs

Singles

As lead artist

As featured artist

Promotional singles

As featured artist

Guest appearances

Notes

References 

1994 births
American male singer-songwriters
Living people
People from Houston
People from Los Angeles
Singer-songwriters from Texas
Singer-songwriters from California
Interscope Records artists